Carlos Alberto Araújo Prestes, best known as Tato (born 17 March 1961) is a Brazilian former  football (soccer) player, who played as a midfielder, best known for his performances for Vasco da Gama and Fluminense. He was born in Curitiba.

Honours
Fluminense
 Campeonato Brasileiro: 1984
 Campeonato Carioca: 1983, 1984, 1985

Vasco da Gama
 Campeonato Brasileiro: 1989

References

1961 births
Living people
Brazilian footballers
Campeonato Brasileiro Série A players
CR Vasco da Gama players
Association football midfielders
Footballers from Curitiba